Archibald Thomas Nevan Leitch (12 March 1906 – 16 September 1989) was an Australian rules footballer who played for the Hawthorn Football Club in the Victorian Football League (VFL).

Notes

External links 

1906 births
1989 deaths
Australian rules footballers from Victoria (Australia)
Hawthorn Football Club players
Moorabbin Football Club players